Events in the year 1913 in Brazil.

Incumbents

Federal government 
 President: Marshal Hermes da Fonseca 
 Vice President: Venceslau Brás

Governors 
 Alagoas: Clodoaldo da Fonseca
 Amazonas: Jônatas de Freitas Pedrosa
 Bahia: José Joaquim Seabra
 Ceará: Marcos Franco Rabelo
 Goiás:
 until June 10: Herculano de Sousa Lobo
 June 10 - July 31: Joaquim Rufino Ramos Jubé
 From July 31: Olegário Herculano da Silva Pinto
 Maranhão: Luís Antônio Domingues da Silva
 Mato Grosso: Joaquim Augusto da Costa Marques
 Minas Gerais: Júlio Bueno Brandão
 Pará: 
 until February 1: João Antônio Luís Coelho
 from February 1: Enéas Martins
 Paraíba: João Castro Pinto
 Paraná: Carlos Cavalcanti de Albuquerque
 Pernambuco: Emídio Dantas Barreto
 Piaui: Miguel de Paiva Rosa
 Rio Grande do Norte: Alberto Maranhão
 Rio Grande do Sul: 
 until 25 January: Carlos Barbosa Gonçalves
 from 25 January: Antônio Augusto Borges de Medeiros
 Santa Catarina:
 São Paulo: Francisco de Paula Rodrigues Alves
 Sergipe:

Vice governors 
 Rio Grande do Norte:
 São Paulo:

Events 
24 January - Borges de Medeiros begins his second term as President of Rio Grande do Sul, taking over from Carlos Barbosa Gonçalves.
11 July - Brazil's foreign minister, Lauro Müller, entertains US dignitaries on board the battleship Minas Geraes during his visit to New York.
12 December - Roosevelt–Rondon Scientific Expedition: Following a speaking tour in Brazil and Argentina, former US President Theodore Roosevelt meets up with Cândido Rondon to embark on a joint exploration of the "River of Doubt".

Births 
 12 January - Rubem Braga
 19 February (in Eu, France) - Prince Pedro Gastão of Orléans-Braganza, claimant to the Brazilian throne (died 2007) 
 1 October - Hélio Gracie, martial artist, founder of Brazilian Jiu-Jitsu (died 2009) 
 12 November - Teleco, footballer (died 2000)

Deaths 
21 January - Aluísio Azevedo, novelist, caricaturist, diplomat, playwright and short story writer (born 1857)
11 August - Brasílio Itiberê da Cunha, composer, lawyer and diplomat (born 1846)

References

See also 
1913 in Brazilian football

 
1910s in Brazil
Years of the 20th century in Brazil
Brazil
Brazil